The 2022 Ohio Valley Conference women's basketball tournament was the final event of the 2021–22 NCAA Division I women's basketball season in the Ohio Valley Conference. The tournament was held March 2–5, 2022, at the Ford Center in Evansville, Indiana.

Seeds 
Only the top eight teams in the conference qualified for the tournament. Teams were seeded by record within the conference, with a tiebreaker system to seed teams with identical conference records. Tiebreakers used were 1) Head-to-head results and 2) comparison of records against individual teams in the conference starting with the top-ranked team and working down.

Schedule

Bracket

* denotes number of overtime periods

References 

2021–22 Ohio Valley Conference women's basketball season
Ohio Valley Conference women's basketball tournament
College basketball tournaments in Indiana
Basketball competitions in Evansville, Indiana
Ohio Valley Conference men's basketball tournament
Ohio Valley Conference men's basketball tournament
Women's sports in Indiana